"The Torture Never Stops" is a song by Frank Zappa from the 1976 album Zoot Allures. Other versions appear on Zappa in New York, Thing-Fish, You Can't Do That on Stage Anymore, Vol. 1, You Can't Do That on Stage Anymore, Vol. 4, The Best Band You Never Heard in Your Life, FZ:OZ, Cheap Thrills, Buffalo, Philly '76, and Hammersmith Odeon.

Zappa played "The Torture Never Stops" in concert from 1975 to 1978, in 1981 and again in 1988.

The song debuted in 1975 as "Why Doesn't Somebody Get Him a Pepsi?" though few of the instrument parts were similar to the album version. Critics have written that while performing the song,  Zappa comes off as calm yet passive-aggressive. Michel Delville, in his essay Frank Zappa, Captain Beefheart and the Secret History of Maximalism contrasted the tone of "The Torture Never Stops" with Brian Eno's album Ambient 1: Music for Airports.

Rat Tomago

A live solo from the song, called "Rat Tomago", was put on the 1979 album Sheik Yerbouti. Like "The Torture Never Stops", it contains the same basic structure, bass line, and female moaning. "Rat Tomago" was nominated for the inaugural Grammy Award for Best Rock Instrumental Performance in 1980, but lost to Paul McCartney and Wings' "Rockestra Theme".

Personnel

Studio version
Frank Zappa – guitar, bass, keyboards, lead vocals
Terry Bozzio – drums

References

1976 songs
Frank Zappa songs
Songs written by Frank Zappa
Captain Beefheart
Song recordings produced by Frank Zappa
Black comedy music